is a railway line in Osaka Prefecture, Japan, owned and operated by Nankai Electric Railway. This line connects to the Nankai Main Line.

History
The line was opened in 1918 and 1919, electrified at 1500 VDC. The maximum speed of the line is 45 km/h. From May 22 2021, the service will be suspended until 2024 due to the construction of the elevated Hagoromo Station, and bus transportation will be carried out.

Stations

References
This article incorporates material from the corresponding article in the Japanese Wikipedia

Takashinohama Line
Rail transport in Osaka Prefecture
Railway lines opened in 1918